Aha Naa-Pellanta! is a 1987 Indian Telugu-language comedy drama film written and directed by Jandhyala, and produced by D. Ramanaidu under his banner Suresh Productions. The film stars Rajendra Prasad and Rajani while Kota Srinivasa Rao, Nutan Prasad, and Brahmanandam play supporting roles. The film has music composed by Ramesh Naidu. An adaptation of Adivishnu's novel Satyam Gaari Illu, the film's title is based on a song from the epic fantasy film Mayabazar (1957). The film released on 27 November 1987.

Aha Naa Pellanta! is considered one of the best comedy films of all time in Telugu cinema. Kota Srinivasa Rao's character as a miser and his mannerism "Naakenti?" became famous. Brahmanandam's role as 'Ara Gundu' received wide appreciation from both critics and audience and it became his breakthrough role.

Made on a budget of 16 lakh, the film grossed over 5 crore at the box office and became a blockbuster. Producer D. Ramanaidu mentioned that the profits from the film helped him in the establishment of Ramanaidu Studios. The film was remade in Kannada as Challenge Gopalakrishna (1990).

Plot
Krishnamurthy (Rajendra Prasad) is the son of industrialist Satyanarayana (Nutan Prasad). Satyanarayana is worried about Krishnamurthy's marriage, so much so that he imagines every young woman who happens to be seen by him as his daughter-in-law. Krishna Murthy meets Padma (Rajani) in his friend's marriage and Cupid strikes them. Krishna Murthy is afraid of revealing his love for Padma to his father directly as he fears his father may reject it outright. His initial attempts to reveal his love life to his father through letters are thwarted by his butler in fear for Satyanarayana's life. Desperate to reveal the love matter to Satyanarayana, Krishnamurthy then tries various gimmicks and at last, is successful. A panicked Satyanarayana inquires about the family background of Padma and finds out that she is the daughter of Lakshmipathy (Kota Srinivasa Rao), a noted miser in his village. Aware of his father's concerns, Krishnamurthy reassures Satyanarayana and lands in Lakshmipathy's house posing as a miser. Krishnamurthy's pretense and pranks beget the intended effect in Lakshmipathy and bring him closer to Padma. A marriage proposal from Sudhakar (Subhalekha Sudhakar), who is accompanied by his two glutton brothers much to the chagrin of Lakshmipathy, for Padma ends in Lakshmipathy favoring Krishnamurthy. Elated with the turn of events, Krishnamurthy prepares for marriage with Padma and invites Satyanarayana. However, his plans turn sour as Lakshmipathy, in his greed for money, abuses Krishnamurthy assuming that he is from a poor family before Satyanarayana confronts Lakshmipathy. A dejected Krishnamurthy requests Satyanarayana to give him one more chance to teach Lakshmipathy a lesson. Krishnamurthy, along with "Aragundu" Brahmanandam (Brahmanandam), a disgruntled butler of Lakshmipathy set about to transform Lakshmipathy. Krishnamurthy tacitly arranges for three different marriage proposals, starting with Sudhakar, with each proposer agreeing to offer more bride price than the earlier proposed. Overcome with greed for money, Lakshmipathy agrees to get his daughter married with each one of them. At the time of marriage with the bridegroom who offered the highest bride price, the other two bridegrooms also appear at the same time and question Lakshmipathy. An embarrassed Lakshmipathy is admonished by Padma for his greed. Lakshmipathy realizes his mistake and redeems himself by getting Padma married to Krishnamurthy.

Cast

 Rajendra Prasad as Krishnamurthy
 Rajani as Padma
 Kota Srinivasa Rao as Lakshmipathy
 Nutan Prasad as Satyanarayana
 Rallapalli as Appanna
 Bramhanandam as Govindu (Ara Gundu)
 Suthi Veerabhadra Rao
 Suthi Velu
 Subhalekha Sudhakar as Kukkuteswara Rao
 Babu Mohan as a member of RTC bus union
 Vidyasagar
 Gundu Hanumantha Rao
 Ashok Kumar as Kaviraju, Hotel manager
 Chitti Babu
 Jenny as Hotel server
 Telangana Shakuntala as Hostel warden
 Sumithra as Rajyam
 Dubbing Janaki as Lakshmipati's wife
 Sandhya
 Jhansi
 Kuali
 Savitri as a special appearance as Sasirekha from Mayabazar in the song Aha Na Pellanta as the title song
 S. V. Ranga Rao as a special appearance as Ghatotkacha from Mayabazar in the song Aha Na Pellanta as the title song

Soundtrack 
Music composed by Ramesh Naidu. Music released on AVM Audio Company.

Reception
Griddaluru Gopalrao of Zamin Ryot, writing his review on 4 December 1987, appreciated the way Jandhyala imbibed humour in the film's dialogues, "Though the comedy scenes are far from reality at times, they are very close in making the audinece laugh [sic]," Gopalrao added.

Legacy 
Jahnavi Reddy of The News Minute, wrote that the film is noted for its dialogues and unique insults, which came to be used commonly in conversations. "While more recent films and their dialogues are frequently woven into conversations, there has been a big change in the kind of Telugu used in these popular dialogue," she added.

References

External links
 

1980s feminist films
1980s Telugu-language films
1987 comedy films
1987 films
Films about Indian weddings
Films directed by Jandhyala
Films scored by Ramesh Naidu
Films shot in Hyderabad, India
Indian comedy-drama films
Indian feminist films
Social realism in film
Suresh Productions films
Telugu films remade in other languages